Euphilotes spaldingi, or Spalding's blue, is a butterfly of the family Lycaenidae. The species was first described by William Barnes and James Halliday McDunnough in 1917. It is found in North America.

The MONA or Hodges number for Euphilotes spaldingi is 4369.1.

Subspecies
Two subspecies belong to Euphilotes spaldingi:
 Euphilotes spaldingi pinjuna Scott, 1981 i g
 Euphilotes spaldingi spaldingi (Barnes & McDunnough, 1917) i g
Data sources: i = ITIS, c = Catalogue of Life, g = GBIF, b = BugGuide

References

Further reading

 

Euphilotes
Articles created by Qbugbot